MOrphogenesis is an EP by industrial black metal band ...And Oceans. It is a compilation including Mare Liberum (Demo) and a live gig from Transvestite Tour in 2000.

Track listing 
 "Trollfan"
 "September"
 "Mikrobotik Fields"
 "Som Oppna Bocker"
 "Karsimyksien Vaaleat Kadet [live]"
 "The Black Vagabond and the Swan of Two Heads [live]"
 "Acid Sex and Marble Teeth [live]"
 "Salipsism / Aquarium of Children [live]"

Credits 
 Killstar – Vocals
 Tripster – guitar
 7even II – guitar
 Atomica – bass
 Plasmaar – keyboards
 Martex – drums

Havoc Unit albums
2001 EPs